Bosara cuneativenis is a moth in the family Geometridae. It is found on Sulawesi.

References

Moths described in 1958
Eupitheciini
Moths of Indonesia